The 2019 WPL All-Stars composed of top players from the Women's Premier League. They competed against the Collegiate All-Americans and a D1/D2 All Star team.

Coaching Staff 

 Eastern Conference: Rosalind Chou
 Western Conference: Parisa Asgharzadeh

WPL All-Star Staff 

 Kitt Wagner Ruiz - Co-Program Director
 Rachel Sachs - Team Doctor
 Britney Simpson - Team Manager
 Annemarie Farrell - Team Management Director
 Kyliana Ruiz - Future WPL All-Star

Players

References

Women's Premier League Rugby All-Stars Rosters